Love for Sale (subtitled Dexter in Radioland Vol. 5) is a live album by American saxophonist Dexter Gordon recorded at the Jazzhus Montmartre in Copenhagen, Denmark in 1964 by Danmarks Radio and released on the SteepleChase label in 1979.

Critical reception 

AllMusic critic Scott Yanow stated "It's recommended, as are all of the releases in this valuable Dexter in Radioland series".

Track listing 
All compositions by Dexter Gordon except where noted.

 Introduction by Dexter Gordon – 1:28
 "Love for Sale" (Cole Porter) – 13:52
 "I Guess I'll Hang My Tears Out to Dry" (Jule Styne, Sammy Cahn) – 9:54
 "Big Fat Butterfly" (Unknown) – 7:01
 "Soul Sister" – 9:30
 "Cherokee" (Ray Noble) – 10:01

Source:

Personnel 
Dexter Gordon – tenor saxophone, vocals
Tete Montoliu – piano
Niels-Henning Ørsted Pedersen – bass
Alex Riel – drums

Source:

References 

SteepleChase Records live albums
Dexter Gordon live albums
1982 live albums
Albums recorded at Jazzhus Montmartre